This is a list of airports in Sierra Leone, sorted by location.

Sierra Leone, officially the Republic of Sierra Leone, is a country in West Africa. It is bordered by Guinea to the north, Liberia to the southeast, and the Atlantic Ocean to the southwest. The country is a constitutional republic comprising three provinces and the Western Area, which are further divided into fourteen districts. The capital and largest city of Sierra Leone is Freetown.

The country's main international airport is Lungi International Airport, located across the Sierra Leone River from Sierra Leone's capital, Freetown. All scheduled commercial airline services in Sierra Leone come to or take off from Lungi. 



Airports 

Names shown in bold indicate the airport has scheduled passenger service on commercial airlines.

See also 
 Transport in Sierra Leone
 List of airports by ICAO code: G#GF - Sierra Leone
 Wikipedia: WikiProject Aviation/Airline destination lists: Africa#Sierra Leone

References 
 
  - includes IATA codes
 Great Circle Mapper: Airports in Sierra Leone - IATA and ICAO codes, coordinates

Sierra Leone
 
Airports
Airports
Sierra Leone